The Princess and the Marine is a 2001 American made-for-television romantic drama film based on the true story of American Marine Jason Johnson and Bahraini Princess Meriam Al-Khalifa, with stars Mark-Paul Gosselaar and Marisol Nichols in the roles of Jason and Meriam.

Plot
Meriam Al Khalifa (Marisol Nichols) is a Bahraini royal who is not content to be in an arranged marriage, even though her strict Muslim parents would never allow a union with a non-Muslim. In the movie, Meriam is allowed to go to the local mall and watch and listen to American pop culture.

One day, she desperately makes some random calls to strangers, including a Marine stationed at the U.S. embassy named Jason Johnson (Mark-Paul Gosselaar). After meeting, the two become friends and later fall in love, but Meriam doesn't tell anyone because of her parents. After being caught kissing at the Tree of Life, her mother forbids any more contact between the two. Meriam and Jason exchange letters with the help of a jeweler in the mall, and plan to run away to America with a fake passport for Meriam and pass her off as a fellow Marine.

Once in America, Meriam is taken in by the local authorities for being an illegal immigrant and is separated from Jason. Meriam is released after asking for asylum, saying she'd be disowned or even killed if she returned to Bahrain. Meriam and Jason marry in Las Vegas, and he is stripped of his insignia and rank to Private in the Marines.

The film concludes with Meriam and Jason stationed at a base, looking outside at an American flag, while a Marine holding a copy of the Quran salutes. It is then that Meriam tells Jason that this is what she believes in (America - freedom).

Cast

Mark-Paul Gosselaar as Jason Johnson
Marisol Nichols as Meriam Al-Khalifa
Luck Hari as Meriam's mother
Alexis Lopes as Latifa
Keith Robinson as Trucker
Sheetal Sheth as Layla

Awards/Nominations
Marisol Nichols was nominated for ALMA Awards-Outstanding Actress for her role in this movie.

See also

Meriam Al Khalifa
House of Khalifa
Bahrain
Tree of Life, Bahrain

References

External links

Interview with Meriam Al Khalifa
Meriam Al Khalifa on Twitter

2000s American films
2000s English-language films
2001 films
2001 romantic drama films
2001 television films
American interfaith romance films
American romantic drama films
American television films
Couples
Films about princesses
Films about the United States Marine Corps
Films directed by Mike Robe
Films set in Bahrain
Films set in the Las Vegas Valley
Films shot in California
Romance films based on actual events
Romance television films